Constantin Popa (born February 18, 1971) is a Romanian-Israeli professional basketball coach and former player.

Biography
Popa played for Dinamo Bucharest in his native Romania before going overseas to play college basketball in the United States for the University of Miami. The tallest person ever to play for the Hurricanes, he was twice a third team All-Big East selection.

In large part on the strength of a highly effective hook shot, he was selected by the L.A. Clippers with the 53rd pick in the 1995 NBA draft.  In the same year he was selected by the Miami Tropics of the USBL as a first round territorial selection (4th pick overall).  He never ended up playing a game in either league, although he did play for the Florida Beachdogs of the American CBA, where he developed somewhat of a cult fan following.

He also played in France with Pau-Orthez and with Maccabi Tel Aviv and Hapoel Jerusalem of Israel.

Although not Jewish, he obtained Israeli citizenship as his wife is Jewish.

Popa retired from professional basketball in 2001.  He served 4 seasons as assistant coach of the University of Indianapolis Greyhound Women's basketball team, before becoming head coach in April 2011. Popa served five seasons as coach of the Greyhounds, compiling a record of 83–66. He was relieved of his duties in March 2016.

In 2019, he was inducted into the University of Miami Sports Hall of Fame.

Awards and achievements
Romanian Junior National Team – 87–90
Romanian National Team – 87–92
European Championships – 87
FIBA U18 European Championship 4th – 90
Big East Conf. 3rd Team – 93, 95
French ProA Champion – 96
Israeli League Champion – 97, 98, 99, 00
Israeli Cup Winner – 98, 99, 00
Euroleague Finalist – 2000
Israeli State Cup Finalist – 01
Israeli League Finalist – 01

References

External links
Constantin Popa bio at hurricanesports.com
Constantin Popa at sports-reference.com

1971 births
Living people
Centers (basketball)
Élan Béarnais players
Expatriate sportspeople in Israel
Florida Beachdogs players
Hapoel Jerusalem B.C. players
Indianapolis Greyhounds women's basketball coaches
Israeli Basketball Premier League players
Los Angeles Clippers draft picks
Maccabi Tel Aviv B.C. players
Miami Hurricanes men's basketball players
Romanian expatriate basketball people in the United States
Romanian expatriate sportspeople in the United States
Romanian expatriate sportspeople in France
Romanian expatriate sportspeople in Israel
Romanian men's basketball players
Romanian people of Israeli descent
Basketball players from Bucharest